is a 1981 Japanese animated film co-written and directed by Isao Takahata, based on the manga of the same name by Etsumi Haruki. The film takes place in the lowly areas of Osaka, where sly and street smart Chie navigates a world where people spend their time drinking, gambling, and brawling. The film was produced by Toho. After the film's success, Takahata served as the chief director for a follow-up TV series.

Plot
Known as "the most unfortunate girl in Japan", ten-year-old Chie is tasked with helping her troublesome Yakuza father run a small tavern in Osaka. Chie sneaks out to visit her mother, who recently left her and her father. Chie schemes a way to reunite the two, but first she tries to figure out how to get her father a real job.

Production

The film was produced by Toho and animated by TMS Entertainment with supporting animation done by Oh! Production. During an interview for the film, Takahata was asked: "After producing a classic like Heidi, how can you now do a film about a girl cooking giblets on skid row in Osaka?" The journalist asking was Toshio Suzuki, who would go on to become the president of Studio Ghibli, working with long-time colleagues Takahata and Hayao Miyazaki.

References

External links
 

1981 films
1981 anime films
1981 comedy films
Animated films based on manga
Films about cats
Films about dysfunctional families
Films directed by Isao Takahata
Films set in Osaka
Toho animated films
TMS Entertainment